Magnetic Skyline is an album by American musicians Kelly Joe Phelps and Corinne West, released in 2010. Most of the songs were released previously on West's solo albums.

Critical reception
Music critic Andrew Mueller wrote in his BBC review of the album "West and Phelps are a natural, effortless pairing... Phelps’ parts lend the songs a depth—in many meanings of the word—somewhat lacking from their original incarnations... If Magnetic Skyline should prove a one-off, it’ll be no less enduringly treasurable. It would be a shame, however, if its creators did not pursue this partnership further."

Track listing
All songs by Corinne West unless otherwise noted.
"Whiskey Poet" – 4:41
"Mother To Child – 4:29
"Horseback In My Dreams" (Joe Tomaselli) – 4:21
"Road to No Compromise" – 4:23
"Lily Ann" – 3:22	
"Lady Luck" – 4:41
"Amelia" (Tomaselli) – 3:53
"River's Fool" – 5:00

Personnel
Kelly Joe Phelps – vocals, guitar
Corinne West – vocals, guitar
Production notes:
Paul Harvey – producer
Kelly Joe Phelps – producer
Corinne West – producer
Marc Broer – engineer
Dann Michael Thompson – engineer, mixing
Martijn Van Waveren – engineer

References

2010 albums
Kelly Joe Phelps albums